WPAY (1400 AM) was an American radio station licensed to serve the community of Portsmouth, Ohio. The station was last owned by Douglas L. Braden and the final broadcast license was held by Radio Stations WPAY/WPFB, Inc. Established in 1925 in the village of Bellefontaine, Ohio, the station ultimately moved to Portsmouth in 1935. WPAY fell silent in June 2011 following the divestiture of sister station WPAY-FM and its license was revoked in June 2012.

History
Prior to being known as WPAY, the station's call letters were WHBD, and was previously licensed to Bellefontaine, later moving to Mt. Orab, and ultimately to Portsmouth. The change to WPAY occurred in April 1935.

After WPAY's owner sold its sister stations to WNKU licensee Northern Kentucky University in January 2011, owner Douglas L. Braden was unable to find a buyer for the lone small-market AM station and the decision was made to take the station off the air for financial reasons while seeking a new buyer. Before falling dark, WPAY broadcast a news/talk radio format branded as "Talk 14" to the Scioto County, Ohio, area.

The station which began broadcasting in Portsmouth on April 15, 1935, ended over 75 years of service in the city, and 85 years overall, on June 3, 2011. Under the terms of the Telecommunications Act of 1996, as a matter of law a radio station's broadcast license is subject to automatic forfeiture and cancellation if they fail to broadcast for one full year.

The station was assigned the call sign "WPAY" by the U.S. Federal Communications Commission (FCC). After the station's broadcast license was revoked, the WPAY call sign was deleted from the FCC database on June 8, 2012.

References

PAY
Defunct radio stations in the United States
Radio stations established in 1925
Radio stations disestablished in 2011
Portsmouth, Ohio
1925 establishments in Ohio
2011 disestablishments in Ohio
PAY